The Deep is an abstract expressionist painting by American painter Jackson Pollock.  Pollock here uses a combination of dripping black and white paints, only to break it down with touches of yellow. There are many interpretations on the meaning of the painting, and the painting's name, most often as a deep and profound void or hole, a viscous cut, or a dying man.

References

External links
 The Deep (1953)

1953 paintings
Abstract expressionism
Paintings by Jackson Pollock